Imre Vagyóczki (sometimes listed as Imre Vágyóczky, 26 July 1932 – 5 March 2023) was a Hungarian sprint canoer who competed in the 1950s. He won a gold medal in the K-4 1000 m at the 1954 ICF Canoe Sprint World Championships in Mâcon.

Vagyóczki also competed in the K-2 1000 m event at the 1956 Summer Olympics in Melbourne, but was eliminated in the heats.

Vagyóczki died in Budapest on 5 March 2023, at the age of 90.

References

Sources

External links 
 
 

1932 births
2023 deaths
Canoeists at the 1956 Summer Olympics
Hungarian male canoeists
Olympic canoeists of Hungary
ICF Canoe Sprint World Championships medalists in kayak
20th-century Hungarian people
Canoeists from Budapest